Jervoise Clarke Jervoise (né Clarke; 27 April 1734 – 5 January 1808) was an English Whig Member of Parliament (MP) who sat in the House of Commons of Great Britain for most of the years from 1768 to 1808.

Jervoise Clarke was the son of Samuel Clarke of Bloomsbury, London, and his wife, Mary Elizabeth. He was entered Emmanuel College, Cambridge in 1751.

At the 1768 general election he was returned as a member of parliament (MP) for Yarmouth, Isle of Wight, but was unseated on petition the following year. He was returned for Yarmouth at the 1774 general election, and in 1777 he took the additional surname Jervoise. He held the Yarmouth seat until he resigned in 1779 to stand at a by-election in Hampshire. He won the seat, and was re-elected in 1784, but was defeated at the 1790 general election.

He was returned to the Commons the following year at a by-election for Yarmouth, and held the seat until his death in 1808.

References

External links 
 

1734 births
1808 deaths
Whig (British political party) MPs for English constituencies
Members of Parliament for the Isle of Wight
British MPs 1768–1774
British MPs 1774–1780
British MPs 1780–1784
British MPs 1784–1790
British MPs 1790–1796
British MPs 1796–1800
UK MPs 1801–1802
UK MPs 1802–1806
UK MPs 1806–1807
UK MPs 1807–1812
Alumni of Emmanuel College, Cambridge